Ramesh Rishidev is an Indian politician from Madhepura district of Bihar, India. He served as Minister of SC & ST Welfare Department, Government of Bihar and was a Member of Bihar Legislative Assembly representing Kumarkhand (Vidhan Sabha constituency).

Early life 
Rishidev was born on 22 January 1970 at Madhepura district of Bihar, India.

Political career 
He contested October 2005 Bihar Legislative Assembly election from Kumarkhand (Vidhan Sabha constituency) and won. Again he contested and won in 2010 and 2015 Bihar legislative assembly elections from Singheshwar (Vidhan Sabha constituency). He was appointed  Minister of SC & ST Welfare Department, Government of Bihar in July 2017.

References 

State cabinet ministers of Bihar
Janata Dal (United) politicians
Bihar MLAs 2005–2010
Bihar MLAs 2010–2015
Bihar MLAs 2015–2020
1970 births
Living people
Bihar MLAs 2020–2025